WUSI or Wusi may refer to:

 May Fourth Movement or Wusi Movement
 Wusi Square
 WUSI (FM), a radio station (90.3 FM) licensed to serve Olney, Illinois, United States
 WUSI-TV, a television station (channel 23, virtual 16) licensed to serve Olney, Illinois
 Wusi language, an Oceanic language spoken in Vanuatu

See also
 Wusih, former spelling of Wuxi, China